Serine/threonine-protein kinase PLK2 is an enzyme that in humans is encoded by the PLK2 gene.

Serum-inducible kinase is a member of the 'polo' family of serine/threonine protein kinases that have a role in normal cell division. [supplied by OMIM]

References

Further reading

EC 2.7.11